Butachauques Airport  is an airport serving Isla Butachauques (es), a central island in the Gulf of Ancud in Chile's Los Lagos Region.

The runway is on the western side of the island, and approach and departures are partially over the water.

See also

Transport in Chile
List of airports in Chile

References

External links
OpenStreetMap - Butachauques
OurAirports - Butachauques
FallingRain - Butachauques Airport

Airports in Chiloé Archipelago